Pickworth is a civil parish and small village in the county of Rutland. The population of the civil parish at the 2001 census was 81. This remained less than 100 at the 2011 census and was included in the town of Stamford.

The village's name means 'enclosure of Pica'.

In the 13th century Pickworth was quite a substantial village, but by the end of the 14th century it was almost non-existent. It now comprises a small parish church, a disused Methodist chapel, a few large houses and a couple of rows of terraced and council houses.

It lies in a landscape characterised by Rutland County Council as the clay woodlands of the Rutland Plateau (a Jurassic limestone plateau).

All Saints' Church, Pickworth was built in 1821 and lies to the west of the village. The church is a Grade II listed building. Maps previously showed the spire of the demolished church under the name Mockbeggar to the west of the current village site.

The remains of the old medieval village lie mainly to the west of the current village centre in an area referred to as Top Pickworth. The only visible remains, other than earthworks, is a stone arch.

Just to the west of the village lie the remains of a lime kiln. In 1817 this was the workplace of local poet John Clare. Both the lime kiln and Walk Farm featured in a television documentary that was made about the poet in the late 1960s.

About  to the west of the village is the site of the Battle of Losecote Field in 1470. It has been claimed that the village was depopulated as a result of the fighting.

See also
Clipsham Old Quarry and Pickworth Great Wood (SSSI)
Newell Wood (SSSI)

References

External links

Villages in Rutland
Civil parishes in Rutland